The 1966–67 WHL season was the 15th season of the Western Hockey League. Seven teams played a 72-game schedule, and the Seattle Totems were the Lester Patrick Cup champions, defeating the as Vancouver Canucks four games to three in the final series.

Prior to the start of the season the San Francisco Seals were purchased by a group that was awarded a National Hockey League expansion team for the 1967–68 season, with plans to move the team to the NHL. The team was renamed the "California Seals" for their last season in the WHL. A new team was also added, the San Diego Gulls.

Guyle Fielder of Seattle led the league in scoring and was named the most valuable player.

Final Standings 

bold - qualified for playoffs

Playoffs 

The Seattle Totems defeated the Vancouver Canucks 4 games to 0 to win the Lester Patrick Cup.

References

Bibliography

 

Western Hockey League (1952–1974) seasons
1966–67 in American ice hockey by league
1966–67 in Canadian ice hockey by league